Richard Birde may refer to:

Richard Birde (MP for Winchester) (died after 1595), MP for Winchester
 Richard Birde (MP for Gloucester) (died 1614), MP for Gloucester

See also
Richard Bird (disambiguation)
Richard Byrd (disambiguation)